Washington Stecanela Cerqueira, or simply Washington (born 1 April 1975), is a Brazilian football pundit, coach, and former player who played as a striker.

Career

In the 2002–03 Turkish league season Washington scored 9 goals in 12 games, but was subsequently released by Fenerbahçe because of his health problems.

Washington was submitted to a coronary catheterization. Once recovered, physicians told him that playing football would not represent a risk to his condition. He then signed with Brazilian club Atlético Paranaense where he was 2004 Série A top-scorer with 34 goals and broke the league's record. For his recovery, he was dubbed Coração Valente, the title of the movie Braveheart in Brazil.

In 2005, he moved to Japan to play for Tokyo Verdy in the J1 League. He had a successful season there with 22 goals in 33 games but could not save his club from relegation. In 2006, he transferred to Urawa Red Diamonds and helped the Reds win their first ever J1 League title, becoming the top scorer in the league with 26 goals in 26 games. In 2007, he was the 2007 FIFA Club World Cup top scorer, helping his team to a third-place finish in the competition.

On 21 December 2007, Washington returned to Brazil to play for Fluminense. His contract was valid through the end of 2008. Washington finished as the 2008 Campeonato Brasileiro Série A top scorer, with 21 goals, tied with Keirrison and Kléber Pereira. Even though he renewed his contract with São Paulo until the end of the 2010 season he eventually returned to Fluminense on July 27, 2010. He played a major role in the team's run to win the 2010 Série A, scoring 10 goals throughout the competition and being involved in the play that guaranteed the team's championship (in the last game of the season).

On 13 January 2011, while training with Fluminense in Mangaratiba, Washington announced his retirement from football.

Career statistics

Club 

* includes Japanese Super Cup and Club World Cup

International

International goals

Honours

Club 
Tokyo Verdy
 Japanese Super Cup: 2005

Urawa Reds
 Japanese Super Cup: 2006
 Emperor's Cup: 2006
 J1 League: 2006
 AFC Champions League: 2007

Fluminense
 Campeonato Brasileiro Série A: 2010

Individual 
 FIFA Club World Cup Top Scorer: 2007
 Brazilian League Top Scorer: 2004, 2008
 São Paulo State Championship Top Scorer: 2001
 Brazilian Cup Top Scorer: 2001
 J.League Top Scorer: 2006
 J.League Best Eleven: 2006

References

External links

1975 births
Living people
Brazilian footballers
Brazilian expatriate footballers
Campeonato Brasileiro Série A players
Club Athletico Paranaense players
Associação Atlética Ponte Preta players
Sociedade Esportiva e Recreativa Caxias do Sul players
Fenerbahçe S.K. footballers
Süper Lig players
Expatriate footballers in Turkey
Grêmio Foot-Ball Porto Alegrense players
Sport Club Internacional players
Tokyo Verdy players
Urawa Red Diamonds players
J1 League players
Brazilian expatriate sportspeople in Turkey
Expatriate footballers in Japan
Brazil international footballers
2001 FIFA Confederations Cup players
São Paulo FC players
Footballers from Brasília
Fluminense FC players
Brazilian expatriate sportspeople in Japan
Association football forwards
Brazilian football managers